Nacha may refer to: 

 Atlach-Nacha, a novel by H. P. Lovecraft
 Nacha Guevara (born 1940), Argentine actress
 Nacha Pop, a Spanish pop/rock group
 Nacha Regules, 1950 Argentine film
 Raut Nacha, a dance performed by the Yadavas clan in India

See also
 NACHA, a payment system organization